Lemoiz is a town and municipality located in the province of Biscay, in the autonomous community of Basque Country, northern Spain. It has a population of about 1243.

It was chosen as the site of the Lemoniz Nuclear Power Plant, but the construction was left unfinished after ecologist opposition and ETA attacks.

References

External links

 LEMOIZ in the Bernardo Estornés Lasa - Auñamendi Encyclopedia (Euskomedia Fundazioa) 
 Pictures from Armintza, a small fishing village located in Lemoiz 

Municipalities in Biscay